Duje Baković (born 7 June 1986) is a Croatian retired football defender who last played for FK Baku.

Club career
Baković previously played in the Croatian First League with NK Rijeka, who sent him on loan to NK Orijent for the 2005-06 season and Greek Beta Ethniki clubs Kavala FC and Egaleo FC.

References

External links

1986 births
Living people
Footballers from Rijeka
Association football defenders
Croatian footballers
Croatia youth international footballers
Croatia under-21 international footballers
HNK Rijeka players
HNK Orijent players
Kavala F.C. players
Egaleo F.C. players
FC Baku players
Croatian Football League players
First Football League (Croatia) players
Football League (Greece) players
Azerbaijan Premier League players
Croatian expatriate footballers
Expatriate footballers in Greece
Croatian expatriate sportspeople in Greece
Expatriate footballers in Azerbaijan
Croatian expatriate sportspeople in Azerbaijan